Egmore (SC) is one of the 234 constituencies of the legislative assembly of Tamil Nadu, India. Its State Assembly Constituency number is 16. It includes the locality of Egmore, which is in Chennai. The seat is reserved for candidates from the Scheduled Castes. Egmore assembly constituency is a part of Chennai Central constituency for national elections to the Parliament of India.

Overview 
As per orders of the Delimitation Commission, No. 16 Egmore Assembly constituency is composed of Ward 42,45-47,61,71-72 & 100-106 of Greater Chennai Corporation

Madras State

Tamil Nadu 

Local parties, such as the DMK, were officially registered as Independent parties, during the 1957 election.

Election results

2021

2016

2011

2006

2001

1996

1991

1989

1984

1980

1977

1971

1967

1962

1957

References 

 

Assembly constituencies of Tamil Nadu
Chennai district